Alfred Shrubb (12 December 1879 – 23 April 1964) was an English middle and long-distance runner. During an amateur career lasting from 1899 to 1905 (when he was barred from amateur competition for receiving payment for running) and a professional career from 1905 to 1912 he won over 1,000 races of about 1,800. At the peak of his career he was virtually unbeatable at distances up to 15 miles, often racing against relay teams so that the race would be more competitive. On 4 November 1904, at Ibrox Park, Glasgow, he broke the one hour run record as well as all amateur records from six to eleven miles, and all professional records from eight to eleven miles, running eleven miles, 1137 yards (18.742 km) in one hour. Altogether he set 28 world records.

He raced ten times against the record-holding Canadian First Nations marathoner Tom Longboat, winning all the races shorter than 20 miles and losing all the longer races. In 1908 he became coach of the Harvard University cross-country team, leading it to a national title. From 1919 to 1928 he coached the University of Oxford Athletics Club.

In 1928 Alfred made his home permanently in Canada, where he operated the Cream of Barley Mill in Bowmanville, Ontario until 1949. He died there in 1964.

He is commemorated by the annual Alfie Shrubb Museum Run in Bowmanville, and the annual Alf Shrubb Memorial 5-mile cross-country run in Slinfold.

See also
5000 metres world record progression
10,000 metres world record progression
Two miles

References

Further reading

Rob Hadgraft. Biography of Alfred Shrubb
Shea, Kevin (2008). "Alfie Shrubb", pp. 36–37 in Bowmanville: 150 Years, 150 Stories. Bowmanville Sesquicentennial Society.

1879 births
1964 deaths
Sportspeople from Clarington
English male middle-distance runners
English male long-distance runners
World record setters in athletics (track and field)
Harvard Crimson coaches
People from Slinfold